A police tribunal is a criminal jurisdiction which judges all classes of contraventions committed by adults. More serious offenses (infractions) are judged by a tribunal correctionnel, correctional tribunal, when they are délits or misdemeanors, or by a cour d'assises (for a crime, analogous to a felony).

Composition 
The police tribunal sits at the tribunal d'instance and is composed of a juge d'instance and a greffier, or court clerk. The ministère public is represented by the procureur de la République or one of his representatives, known as substituts (substitutes) if the offense is a fifth-degree contravention.

Jurisdiction

Jurisdiction of subject (ratione materiæ) 
The police tribunal handles contraventions, except offenses punishable by a penalty of imprisonment or of fines greater than 3,000 euros, voire 4,000(? -t) euros 
(Article 521 of the code de procédure pénale, Code of Penal Procedure). The version approved November 18, 2016 provides for a few exceptions, such as an edict of the Conseil d'État. The police tribunal is also competent d'attribution, meaning it also has jurisdiction, in matters of customs, as provided by Article 356 of the Code des douanes, Code of Customs, which specifies that the "tribunaux de police connaissent des contraventions douanières et de toutes les questions douanières soulevées par voie d'exception," (the police tribunals have authority ("know") in customs infractions and in all customs questions which may arise as exceptions).

Jurisdiction of place (ratione loci) 
The police tribunal may handle infractions from any of the following relevant scopes of authority:
 place of the infraction's commission or discovery
 of the defendant's residence
 site of an impounded subject vehicle
The other compétence rules are identical to those of the tribunal correctionnel, (correctional tribunal).

References

External links 
  Texts of laws governing police tribunals
  Police tribunals on the site of the French Ministry of Justice

Courts in France
Jurisdiction
Penal system in France
Criminal justice